Kosŏng station is a railway station in Kosŏng-ŭp, Kosŏng county, Kangwŏn province, North Korea on the Kŭmgangsan Ch'ŏngnyŏn Line of the Korean State Railway.

History

The station, originally called Changjŏn station, was opened on 1 August 1932 by the Chosen Government Railway, along with the rest of the fourth section of the original Tonghae Pukpu Line from Tup'o to here.

References

Railway stations in North Korea